Roda '46 (self-styled as RODA '46) is a Dutch football club from Leusden. It was founded on 15 September 1946. The club has Saturday and Sunday football teams. Its Saturday football team plays in 2018–2019 in the Eerste Klasse, while its Sunday team plays in the Derde Klasse. Roda's home grounds are at the Buiningpark in Leusden.

With 1600 members and about 100 teams, Roda '46 is one of the larger clubs in the Amersfoort region. The professional journal De VoetbalTrainer ranked the youth department of Roda in 2017 as belonging top 10 of the Netherlands and #1 in its region. Roda '46 has a collaboration agreement with Vitesse Arnhem.

History
During the preparation for the 2018–2019 season, Hoofdklasse-side VV De Meern could barely beat Roda 2–1.

References

External links 
 Official website

Football clubs in the Netherlands
Football clubs in Utrecht (province)
Sport in Leusden
Association football clubs established in 1946
1946 establishments in the Netherlands